Joan Crespí or Juan Crespí (1 March 1721 – 1 January 1782) was a Franciscan missionary and explorer of Las Californias.

Biography 

A native of Majorca, Crespí entered the Franciscan order at the age of seventeen. He came to New Spain in 1749, and accompanied explorers Francisco Palóu and Junípero Serra. In 1767 he went to the Baja California Peninsula and was placed in charge of the Misión La Purísima Concepción de Cadegomó.

In 1769, Crespí joined the expedition led by Gaspar de Portolá and Junípero Serra (see Timeline of the Portolá expedition). He traveled in the vanguard of the land expedition to San Diego, led by Captain Fernando Rivera y Moncada, where a presidio and mission were established. Crespí then continued north with Portolá and Rivera to identify the port of Monterey. Because he was the only one of the Franciscans to make the entire journey by land, Crespí became the first official diarist for the missions. He was one of three diarists to document the first exploration by Europeans of interior areas of Alta California.

After reaching Monterey in October 1769, Crespí continued with the expedition that explored as far north as present-day San Francisco, and became one of the first Europeans to see San Francisco Bay. All told, the expedition traveled in the future state of California through the present-day coastal counties of San Diego, Orange, Los Angeles, Ventura, Santa Barbara, San Luis Obispo, Monterey, Santa Cruz, San Mateo, and San Francisco.

In 1772, Crespí accompanied Captain Pedro Fages on an exploration of areas to the east of San Francisco Bay. The Fages expedition members were the first Europeans to see the Sacramento River and the San Joaquin Valley.

In 1774, Crespí was chaplain of the expedition to the North Pacific conducted by Juan José Pérez Hernández. His diaries, first published in H. E. Bolton's Fray Juan Crespi (1927, repr. 1971), and published in the original Spanish with facing page translations as A Description of Distant Roads: Original Journals of the First Expedition into California, 1769-1770 (2001) provided valuable records of these expeditions. One chapel he built, at the Misión San Francisco del Valle de Tilaco in Landa, is reported as still standing.

Recognition
A Catholic boys' school, Crespi Carmelite High School in Encino, is named for him, as was a middle school in the West Contra Costa Unified School District. The latter was renamed Betty Reid Soskin Middle School on her hundredth birthday on September 22, 2021.

References

External links 

 

1721 births
1782 deaths
Spanish explorers of North America
Spanish Franciscans
History of Baja California
Priests of the Spanish missions in California
Spanish history in the Pacific Northwest
18th-century Spanish people
18th-century American Roman Catholic priests
18th-century explorers
Burials at Mission San Carlos Borromeo de Carmelo
Spanish Roman Catholic missionaries
People of the Californias
Roman Catholic missionaries in New Spain